Sumatriptan/naproxen, sold under the brand name Treximet among others, is a fixed-dose combination medication used to treat migraines. It is taken by mouth. It contains sumatriptan, as the succinate, a serotonin 5-hydroxytryptamine (5-HT) 1b/1d receptor agonist (triptan); and naproxen as the sodium salt, a member of the arylacetic acid group of nonsteroidal anti-inflammatory drugs (NSAIDs).

Medical uses
Sumatriptan/naproxen is indicated for the acute treatment of migraine with or without aura in people twelve years of age and older.

A Cochrane review in 2020 found that the combination of sumatriptan plus naproxen was better than placebo for relieving acute migraine attacks in adults. When the starting headache intensity was mild, 5 in 10 (50%) of people treated with the combination were pain-free at two hours compared with about 2 in 10 (18%) with placebo. Almost 6 in 10 (58%) people with moderate or severe pain who were treated with the combination had pain reduced to mild or none at two hours, compared with 3 in 10 (27%) with placebo. The combination was also better than the same dose of either drug given alone in these people. Results were 5 in 10 (52%) people with sumatriptan alone or about 4 in 10 (44%) with naproxen alone.

Side effects
Some of the listed side effects include dizziness, nausea, sleepiness, dry mouth, pain in neck, throat or jaw, numbness or tingling.

References

External links 
 

Antimigraine drugs
Combination drugs